Kunigunde of Altdorf (also known as Cunegonde or Chuniza;  – 31 August 1054) was a member of the Swabian line of the Elder House of Welf. She was also the ancestress of the younger House of Guelph, a cadet branch of the House of Este.

Life 
Kunigunde was the only daughter of Welf II, Count of Altdorf, and Imiza of Luxembourg. She was named after her mother’s aunt Cunigunde, who was married to Emperor Henry II. Her brother was Welf III (died 1055), the last member of the Elder House of Welf.

Kunigunde married  to Albert Azzo II, Margrave of Milan, Luni, and Tortona.  He was the only son of Albert Azzo I and his wife Adelaide. Kunigunde's dowry included the estate of Elisina (modern Solesino) which had formed part of her mother, Imiza’s dowry.

Kunigunde and Albert Azzo had one son:
Welf IV (between 1030 and 1040 – 9 November 1101 in Paphos).  He was named after his uncle, Welf III, whose property he later inherited. In 1070, Welf IV also succeeded to the duchy of Bavaria, which had once been ruled by his great-great-uncle Henry V, Duke of Bavaria.

References 
B. Schneidmüller: Die Welfen. Herrschaft und Erinnerung (819–1252). (Stuttgart, 2000)
K. Baaken, ‘Elisina curtis nobilissima. Welfischer Besitz in der Markgrafschaft Verona und die Datierung der Historia Welforum,’ Deutsches Archiv 55 (1999), 63-94
 Heinrich der Löwe, Insel-Verlag,

Notes

Margravines of Germany
House of Welf
11th-century births
1054 deaths
11th-century German women
Year of birth unknown
11th-century German nobility
Swabian nobility